Kenneth D. Craig (born 1937) is a Canadian psychologist, educator and scientist whose research primarily concerns pain assessment, understanding pain in children and populations with communication limitations, and the social dimensions of pain.

Career
Kenneth Craig was born in Calgary in 1937. He obtained his BA from Sir George Williams College (now Concordia University) in Montreal in 1958 followed by an MA from the University of British Columbia in 1960. He then went to Purdue University from which he graduated in 1964 with a Ph.D. in Clinical Psychology.  This included a research fellowship and internship at the University of Oregon Medical School where he became interested in the study of pain which has remained the focus of his research for more than 40 years.  He has served as editor-in-chief of the Canadian Journal of Behavioural Science (1985–89) and Pain Research & Management (2006–17).  He has received many honours and distinctions, including appointment as an Officer of the Order of Canada in 2016.

He was appointed to the faculty at the University of British Columbia in 1963 and has remained there throughout his academic career, with sabbaticals at Oxford University and the University of Calgary.  He served as Director of the Graduate Programme in Clinical Psychology and Associate Dean in the Faculty of Graduate Studies. He also served as a Canadian Institutes of Health Research Senior Investigator and a Canada Council I.W. Killam Research Fellow.  He was appointed in 2003 as Emeritus Professor of Psychology.

Research
His research addresses psycho-social features of pain with a focus on pain assessment, particularly in populations with communication limitations, including infants, children and people with cognitive impairments. This work has compelled greater understanding of the importance of the social context in understanding pain experience and expression, the challenges of self-presentation and observer bias in understanding the pain of others, leading to the Social Communication Model of Pain.  He pioneered development of measurement tools for pain in infants, young children, people with intellectual disabilities and persons with dementia, primarily focusing upon nonverbal behaviour and facial expression.  His contributions to development of a facial expression measure of pain in the mouse led to burgeoning interest in measurement of pain in nonhuman animals.
He has authored a large number of journal articles and chapters and authored or edited 11 books.  He has a Google Scholar count of over 20,000 and a H index of 82.

Publications

 Grunau, R., & Craig, K. (1987). Pain expression in neonates: facial action and cry. Pain 28 (3), 395-410
 Craig, K., et al. (1993). Pain in the preterm neonate: behavioural and physiological indices. Pain 52 (3), 287-299
 Hadjistavropoulos, T., & Craig, K. (2002). A theoretical framework for understanding self-report and observational measures of pain: a communications model. Behaviour research and therapy 40 (5), 551-570
 Craig, K. (2015).  The Social Communication Model of Pain.  Pain, 156, 1198-1199
 Craig, K., et al. (2020).  Pain in persons who are marginalized by social conditions.  Pain, 161, 261-265

Awards
 2019: Fellow, Canadian Academy of Health Sciences
 2015: Officer of the Order of Canada
 2015: Hon LL.D., Dalhousie University
 2013: Distinguished Lifetime Achievement Award, International Association for the Study of Pain
 2012: Distinguished Career Award, Canadian Pain Society
 2008: Gold Medal Award, Canadian Psychological Association
 2002: CPA Donald O. Hebb Award for Distinguished Contributions to Psychology as a Science
 2002: Jeffrey Lawson Award for Advocacy in Children's Pain Relief, American Pain Society
 1981: Fellow, American Psychological Association

Positions
 Editor-in-Chief, Pain Research & Management 
 Editor, Canadian Journal of Behavioural Science
 President, Canadian Psychological Association
 President, Canadian Pain Society

References

1937 births
Canadian psychologists
Living people
Clinical psychologists
Academic staff of the University of British Columbia
People from Calgary
Presidents of the Canadian Psychological Association
20th-century Canadian psychologists